Huntwick with Foulby and Nostell is a civil parish in the metropolitan borough of the City of Wakefield, West Yorkshire, England.  In the parish were 34 listed buildings that are recorded in the National Heritage List for England.  Of these, three are listed at Grade I, the highest of the three grades, three are at Grade II*, the middle grade, and the others are at Grade II, the lowest grade.  The most important building is Nostell Priory, which is listed, together with associated buildings, and structures in the surrounding park.  The other major building is the Church of St. Michael and Our Lady, which is also listed, together with monuments in its churchyard.  The other listed buildings are houses, cottages, farmhouses and farm buildings, and a bridge.


Key

Buildings

References

Citations

Sources

 

Lists of listed buildings in West Yorkshire